Daniel R. Garcia is a former professional baseball player, coach, scout, and executive. He played for the Kansas City Royals of Major League Baseball (MLB) during the 1981 season.

A Cuban-American raised in Queens, New York, Garcia studied cognitive behavioral psychology at Bernard M. Baruch College. He was a bat boy for the 1973 National League Champion New York Mets and a former member of the 1974 National Baseball Congress Champion Alaska Goldpanners baseball team.

Drafted as an outfielder by the KC Royals in the 11th round of the 1975 Major League Baseball draft. He played in the minor leagues for seven seasons before reaching the major leagues in 1981. In 862 minor league games compiled 862 hits, a .292 batting average with 200 stolen bases. His best season occurred in 1980 with the Triple-A Omaha Royals batting .320, which was good for fourth place in the American Association. That same winter, he won a batting title for the Leones del Caracas, of the Venezuelan Professional Baseball League. During the spring of the 1982 season, he tied a Mexican League record with 10 consecutive hits while hitting .424 for the Tigres Capitalinos. He retired after the 1982 season hitting .378 for the Double-A Buffalo Bisons. Later in his career, he went to Australia, as a player/hitting coach with the Brisbane Bandits of the Australian Baseball League.

1990 to 1992, he became a minor league hitting and mental skills coach for the San Diego Padres.  1992 to 1999, he was a Major League scout and Latin-American Coordinator for the Milwaukee Brewers before being named a Special Assistant to the General Manager, Player Personnel, for the Baltimore Orioles from 1999 to 2003. He is a success strategies personal coach and baseball instructor, specializing on the mental approach to the game, and life. He often writes on the insights learned as a professional athlete, and the similarities in having a successful life.

References

External links

Retrosheet
Venezuelan Professional Baseball League

1954 births
Living people
American expatriate baseball players in Mexico
American sportspeople of Cuban descent
Baruch Bearcats baseball players
Baseball players from New York (state)
Buffalo Bisons (minor league) players
Daytona Beach Islanders players
Fort Myers Royals players
Gulf Coast Royals players
Jacksonville Suns players
Kansas City Royals players
Leones del Caracas players
American expatriate baseball players in Venezuela
Venezuelan Professional Baseball League 
Major League Baseball first basemen
Major League Baseball left fielders
Major League Baseball right fielders
Mexican League baseball players
Omaha Royals players
Tiburones de La Guaira players
Tigres del México players
Waterloo Royals players
American expatriate baseball players in Australia
Brisbane Bandits players
Alaska Goldpanners of Fairbanks players
Jamaica High School (New York City) alumni